Scott Robertson may refer to:
Scotty Robertson (1930–2011), American basketball coach
Scott Robertson (rugby union) (born 1974), New Zealand rugby coach
Scott Robertson (footballer, born 1985), Scottish football player (Dundee United, Hibernian, Botoșani)
Scott Robertson (footballer, born 1987), Scottish football player (Queen of the South, Partick Thistle, Stranraer)
Scott Robertson (footballer, born 2001), Scottish football player (Celtic and Crewe Alexandra)
Scott Robertson (diver) (born 1987), Australian diver